Droëwors (Afrikaans literally "dry sausage") is a Southern African snack food, based on the traditional, coriander-seed spiced boerewors sausage.  It is usually made as a dunwors (Afrikaans for "thin sausage") rather than dikwors ("thick sausage"), as the thinner sausage dries quicker and is thus, less likely to spoil before it can be preserved.  If dikwors is to be used, it is usually flattened to provide a larger surface area for drying.

The recipe used for these dried sausages is similar to that for boerewors, though pork and veal are usually replaced by beef, as the former can go rancid when dried, mutton fat replaces the pork fat used in boerewors.  Drying makes the sausage ideal for unrefrigerated storage.

Droëwors is unusual among dried meats in being dried quickly in warm, dry conditions, unlike traditional droge worst and
Italian cured salumi, which are dried slowly in relatively cold and humid conditions.  A further difference is that droëwors does not contain a curing agent as found in a traditional cured sausage. A direct result of this is that droëwors should not be kept in moist conditions as mold can begin to form more easily than would happen with a cured sausage.

This product is related both in name and in nature to the Dutch droge worst, also known as metworst.

See also 

 Biltong
 List of dried foods
 South African cuisine

References

 Fermented sausages
 Afrikaans words and phrases
 South African English
 South African cuisine